Raphidiophrys drakena is a species of protist in the genus of Raphidiophrys. It is a unicellular eukaryote with a cell diameter of 26.7±0.39 μm and several cell surface features like axopodia, kinecysts and a tangential scale layer. The scales have a length of 6.0±0.18 μm and a width of 3.5±0.14 μm. R. drakena differs from other morphologically studied members of the genus Rhaphidiophrys by lacking spicules on its surface.

References 

Microscopic eukaryotes